Berezovaya Gora is a rural locality (a village) in Beryozovsky District, Perm Krai, Russia. The population was 53 as of 2010.

References 

Rural localities in Beryozovsky District, Perm Krai